Karl Bauermeister (born 28 January 1963) from Port Elizabeth, South Africa, was a right-handed batsman and a decent allrounder during the 1980s. He played provincial one-matches representing the Eastern Cape. He played with several Springbok players, both as a junior and at provincial cricket.

References

External links
 Cricinfo Player Profile

1963 births
Living people
South African cricketers
Border cricketers
Eastern Province cricketers
Free State cricketers
Cricketers from Port Elizabeth